The 2017–18 Georgia bulldogs basketball team represented the University of Georgia during the 2017–18 NCAA Division I men's basketball season. The team's head coach was Mark Fox in his ninth season at UGA. They played their home games at Stegeman Coliseum as members of the Southeastern Conference. The Bulldogs finished the season 18–15, 7–11 in SEC play to finish in a tie for 11th place. As the No. 12 seed in the SEC tournament, they defeated Vanderbilt and Missouri before losing to Kentucky in the quarterfinals.

On March 10, 2018, the school fired head coach Mark Fox after nine seasons at Georgia. On March 13, the school hired former Indiana coach Tom Crean to replace Fox.

Previous season
The Bulldogs finished the 2016–17 season 19–15, 9–9 in SEC play to finish in eighth place. They defeated Tennessee in the second round of the SEC tournament to advance to the quarterfinals where they lost to Kentucky. They were invited to the National Invitation Tournament where they lost in the First Round to Belmont.

Offseason

Departures

2017 recruiting class

2018 recruiting class

Roster

Schedule and results

|-
!colspan=12 style=|Exhibition

|-
!colspan=12 style=| Regular season

|-
!colspan=9 style=| SEC Tournament

References

Georgia Bulldogs basketball seasons
Georgia
Georgia Bulldogs
Georgia Bulldogs